Choghadiya refers to an auspicious period of twenty-four minutes in Indian astrology.

Etymology 
Ghadi (now used for a clock in Hindi) is an ancient measure for calculations of time in India roughly equivalent to 24 minutes. Cho-ghadiya means four ghadi which totals to 96 minutes. Most of choghadiya are of a figure around 96 minutes.

About
it is advisable to perform necessary prayers, on a particular time phase of the day to get maximum benefits of health, wealth and prosperity. One can get the appropriate time of Muhurta (Auspicious Occasion)  from the Panchang.

Types of Choghadiya
There are totally seven types of Choghdiya.
 Amrut, Shubh and Labh are considered the most auspicious Choghadiyas. (Time Period)
 Chal is considered as good Choghadiya . (Time Period)
 Udveg, Kal and Rog is considered inauspicious.

Method of calculation
Each day is divided into two time periods: 
Daytime   - the period from sunrise to sunset  
Nighttime - the period from sunset to sunrise. 

Each period contains eight Choghadiya's. The daytime difference is arrived at by calculating the difference between Sunrise and Sunset and dividing the same by 8.

Example

Day 1: Sunrise at 6:00 AM and Sunset  at 6:01 pm
Day 2: Sunrise  at 6:00 am

based on the above 
The daytime period is 12 hours and 01 minutes (721 minutes).
The nighttime period is 11 hours and 59 minutes (719 minutes).

Therefore, each daytime Choghadiya lasts 721/8 = 90.125 minutes = 1 hour 30 minutes 7.5 seconds
And each night-time Choghadiya last 736/8 = 92 minutes = 1 hour 29 minutes 52.5 second

References

Hindu astronomy
Hindu astrology
Technical factors of astrology
Calendars